Ex nihilo is a Latin phrase meaning "out of nothing" that may refer to:

 Creatio ex nihilo, the belief that matter is not eternal, but had to be divinely created
 Ex nihilo nihil fit, Latin for the philosophical dictum "nothing comes from nothing"
 Ex nihilo lexical enrichment, adding of new words not deriving from pre-existing word
 Ex Nihilo (comics), a fictional character
 Ex Nihilo (magazine), former name of a creationist magazine
 Ex Nihilo (sculpture), a sculpture by Frederick Hart
 Agat Films & Cie – Ex Nihilo, a French film production and distribution company